Lace is a lightweight fabric patterned with open holes.

Lace(s) may also refer to:

Arts and media

Films
 Lace (1926 film), a German silent crime film
 Lace (1928 film), a Soviet silent film
 Laces (film), a 2018 Israeli film

Music
 Lace (band), a Canadian country music trio
 Lace (album), the Canadian country music trio's self-titled debut album
 Lace, one-person band of music producer and songwriter Pete Dello (b. 1942)
 Laced (album), a 1999 album by rap-metal group Reveille
 The Lace, a 1986 album by Benjamin Orr

Other uses in arts, entertainment, and media
 Lace (miniseries), a 1984 TV mini-series, based on a novel of the same name by Shirley Conran
 Miss Lace, the protagonist of Male Call

People with the name
 John Henry Lace (1857–1918), British botanist

Technology
 Cable lacing, a method in electronics for tying wiring harnesses and cable looms
 Lace Sensor, a brand of guitar pickup
 Liquid air cycle engine, a type of spacecraft propulsion engine
 Luton Analogue Computing Engine, a computer developed by English Electric for military purposes
 Lunar Atmospheric Composition Experiment, deployed in 1972 by Apollo 17

Other uses
 Lacing (drugs), where one substance has been secretly mixed or added to another
 Latsch (Italian: Laces), a comune (municipality) in northern Italy
 Los Angeles Contemporary Exhibitions, an art gallery founded in Los Angeles, California in 1978
 Shoelaces, or laces, a thin cord fitted to each of a pair of shoes to keep the shoes in place
 Lāce, feminine form of the Latvian surname Lācis

See also
 Interlace (disambiguation)
 Lacing, the pattern left by the foam on the inside of a glass of beer as it is drunk and the head moves down
 Lacing, a process in wheelbuilding, in which spokes are connected between the hub and the rim